The 1957 World Table Tennis Championships mixed doubles was the 24th edition of the mixed doubles championship.
Ichiro Ogimura and Fujie Eguchi won the title after defeating Ivan Andreadis and Ann Haydon in the final by three sets to two.

Results

See also
List of World Table Tennis Championships medalists

References

-